Dilawar Khan (born 23 May 1984) is a Pakistani first-class cricketer who played for Abbottabad cricket team.

References

External links
 

1984 births
Living people
Pakistani cricketers
Abbottabad cricketers
Cricketers from Peshawar
Peshawar cricketers
Sui Southern Gas Company cricketers